Simarterivirinae is a subfamily of enveloped, positive-strand RNA viruses which infect vertebrate. The subfamily is in the family Arteriviridae and order Nidovirales. The subfamily contains six genera.

Structure 
Member viruses are enveloped, spherical, and 45–60 nm in diameter.

Genome 
Variarteriviruses have a positive-sense single-stranded RNA genome.

Taxonomy 
The subfamily Simarterivirinae contains six genera:

Deltaarterivirus
Epsilonarterivirus
Etaarterivirus
Iotaarterivirus
Thetaarterivirus
Zetaarterivirus

References 

Nidovirales
Arteriviridae
Virus subfamilies